The Kirti Nagar Metro Station is located on the Blue Line of the Delhi Metro.

It is one of the terminus stations of the Green Line, the other being Inderlok.

An extension of the Green Line, commuters travelling on the Green Line are able to transfer to Blue Line from this station as well as the Red Line at Inderlok via Ashok Park Main, saving time and money, rather than going all the way to longer routes of Rajiv Chowk and Kashmere Gate. This branch opened on 27 August 2011.

A new Metrolite Line is under construction and will be completed by 2025. It will run from Kirti Nagar to Bamnoli Village, with 22 stations. The stations for the line will be built in a mix of elevated, and at-grade stations.

Some recreational places include Moments Mall, BTW Kirti Nagar, Furniture Market, Sunday Market, and other popular eatery shops spread throughout the area.

See also
List of Delhi Metro stations
Transport in Delhi

References

External links

 Delhi Metro Rail Corporation Ltd. (Official site) 
 Delhi Metro Annual Reports
 

Delhi Metro stations
Railway stations opened in 2005
Railway stations in West Delhi district